Brisbane Organising Committee for the 2032 Olympic and Paralympic Games (BNEOCOG) was established by the Brisbane Olympic and Paralympic Games Arrangements Act 2021  passed by the Queensland Parliament in December 2021. It is a statutory authority and its role is "to plan, organise and deliver the Olympic and Paralympic Games in accordance with the host contract".

The legislation outlines the functions and board composition of the Organising Committee. At least 50% of the nominated directors holding office must be women. It is likely that the Board will change between 2021 and 2032 due to changes in roles and term limitations.

Prior to Brisbane winning the right to host the 2032 Olympics and Paralympics, the Commonwealth Government committed to fund half the costs of critical infrastructure with the Queensland Government. An Olympic Infrastructure Agency would be established with shared governance arrangements and oversee all projects from the planning, scoping and design phase through to contracting, construction and delivery.

Board

Management
In December 2022, Cindy Hook was appointed Chief Executive Officer.

See also 

 2032 Summer Olympics
 2032 Summer Paralympics

References 

2032 Summer Olympics
2032 Summer Paralympics
Organising Committees for the Olympic Games
Summer Olympics and Paralympics
Sport in Queensland